Huilma is a hamlet northwest of the town of Río Negro and southwest of the city of Osorno in south-central Chile. It lies along to Chile Route U-72. The hamlet had 58 inhabitants as of 2017.

References

Populated places in Osorno Province